The European Women's Hockey League, abbreviated EWHL, is an international ice hockey league. Created as the Elite Women's Hockey League in 2004 by the International Ice Hockey Federation (IIHF), the EWHL comprises clubs from several countries in Central Europe and one team from Kazakhstan, and is played in parallel to national championships.

History
The EWHL was created in 2004 on the same principle as the men's ice hockey Interliga. For its first season, the EWHL featured teams from Austria, Hungary, Italy and Slovenia. Teams from additional countries joined the league during the following seasons, including HC Slovan Bratislava from Slovakia in 2005, KHL Grič Zagreb from Croatia in 2006, and HC Slavia Praha from the Czech Republic in 2007. In the 2008–09 season, the Italian and Hungarian teams gave way to two clubs from Germany, OSC Berlin and ESC Planegg. During the 2010–11 and 2011–12 seasons, the Netherlands national team participated in the EWHL. 

Before the 2019–20 season, the Elite Women's Hockey League was renamed, becoming the European Women's Hockey League to reflect its unique position within European women's ice hockey. Also, the Polish women's national team joined the league in 2019, playing as the Silesia Brackens and later under the name Silesian Metropolis Katowice. The Hungarian team KMH Budapest rejoined the league, and MAC Budapest was added.

The EWHL is mostly played in a championship format with home and away matches, with the exception of the 2005–06 season where the teams were distributed in two regional divisions followed by qualifying rounds. For the 2010–11 season, the regular season was followed by a play-off between the four teams at the top of the league table. 

Though they joined the league in the 2015–16 season, Kazakh team Aisulu Almaty has played only two EWHL games from their home arena, Baluan Sholak Sports Palace in Almaty, due to the significant travel distance. The 2019–20 season provided the first opportunity for Aisulu to play EWHL matches in front of a home crowd, when they hosted the EHV Sabres for a two game series during 19–20 October 2019. 

Since the 2019–20 season, the Hungarian Ice Hockey Federation has overseen the league. The league president is Martin Kogler.

Teams

2022–23 season

Former teams 

Austria
DEC Dragons Klagenfurt
EHV Sabres Vienna
Southern Stars
SPG Sabres/Flyers United
WE-V Flyers

Belarus
 HK Pantera Minsk

Croatia
 KHL Grič Zagreb

Czech Republic
 HC Slavia Praha

Denmark
 Hvidovre IK

Germany
 ESC Planegg-Würmtal
 OSC Eisladies Berlin

Hungary
 Budapest Stars
 MAC Marilyn Budapest

Italy
 HC Agordo
 HC Eagles Bolzano

Netherlands
 Netherlands women's national team

Slovakia
 HC Slovan Bratislava
 HK Spišská Nová Ves
 MHK Martin
 ŽHK Poprad (Popradské Líšky)

Slovenia
HDK Maribor
HK Gorenjska
HK Olimpija Ljubljana
HK Terme Maribor
HK Triglav Kranj

Championship

Medal table by club

Notes:

See also 
 EWHL Super Cup
 Austria women's ice hockey Bundesliga 
 German women's ice hockey Bundesliga

References
This article incorporates information from the existing French Wikipedia article at :fr:Ligue élite féminine de hockey and the existing German Wikipedia article at :de:European Women’s Hockey League; see their histories for attribution.

External links
 EWHL News
  EWHL Website
 European Women's Hockey Journal (in German) 

1
Sports leagues established in 2004
2004 establishments in Europe
Multi-national ice hockey leagues in Europe
Multi-national professional sports leagues